The Monkey Buffet Festival is held annually in Lopburi, Thailand. In 2007, the festival included giving fruits and vegetables to the local monkey population of 2,000 crab-eating macaques in Lopburi Province north of Bangkok.

The festival was described as one of the strangest festivals by London's Guardian newspaper along with Spain's baby-jumping festival. A photograph from the Monkey Buffet Festival at Phra Prang Sam Yod temple in Lopburi Province shows a monkey trying to get at fresh fruits and vegetables embedded in blocks of ice.

References

Animal festival or ritual
Festivals in Thailand
Food and drink festivals in Thailand